Podhorce may refer to:

Polish name for Pidhirtsi in Ukraine
Podhorce, Hrubieszów County in Lublin Voivodeship (east Poland)
Podhorce, Tomaszów Lubelski County in Lublin Voivodeship (east Poland)